A Köte (also Köthe) is the term used in the Harz Mountains of central Germany for a charcoal burner's hut (Köhlerhütte). A Köte was occupied by a charcoal burner in order to look after a nearby wood pile (Kohlenmeiler). The charcoal burner prepared the necessary charcoal for the smelting of ores.

Today, Köten are used for tourism purposes as shelters and rest stops for hikers.

Examples 
There are replicas of Köten in the Harz, for example at these places:

Gallery

References 

Vernacular architecture
Buildings and structures in the Harz
Charcoal